Tatar dragon may refer to:
 Zilant
 Yelbeghen

See also
 Chuvash dragons 
 Yuxa